Kurt Baumgartner (born 29 March 1943) is an Austrian boxer. He competed in the men's light heavyweight event at the 1968 Summer Olympics. At the 1968 Summer Olympics, he defeated Soungalo Bagayogo of Mali, before losing to Walter Facchinetti of Italy.

References

1943 births
Living people
Austrian male boxers
Olympic boxers of Austria
Boxers at the 1968 Summer Olympics
Light-heavyweight boxers